is a junction railway station located in the city of Kesennuma, Miyagi, Japan, operated by the East Japan Railway Company (JR East).

Lines
Kesennuma Station was a junction station served by the Ōfunato Line and the Kesennuma Line. Since the March 2011 Tōhoku earthquake and tsunami, services on the Kesennuma Line between Kesennuma and  have been suspended, and services replaced by a provisional bus rapid transit line.

Station layout
The station has a single side platform and an island platform connected to the station building by a footbridge. The station has a Midori no Madoguchi staffed ticket office.

Platforms

History
Kesennuma Station opened on 31 July 1929 on the Ōfunato Line. Passenger services on the Kesennuma Line began on 11 February 1957. The station was absorbed into the JR East network upon the privatization of the Japanese National Railways (JNR) on April 1, 1987. Since the March 2011 Tōhoku earthquake and tsunami, the station has become the de facto terminal station of the Ōfunato Line, with services beyond the station replaced by a provisional bus rapid transit line. Services on the Kesennuma Line have also been suspended and replaced by a bus line.

Passenger statistics
In fiscal 2018, the  station was used by an average of 196 passengers daily (boarding passengers only).

Surrounding area
 
 Kesennuma Furumachi post office
Kesennuma tax office

See also
 List of Railway Stations in Japan

References

External links

  
  video of a train trip from Kesennuma Station to Minami-Kesennuma Station in 2009, passing through Fudōnosawa Station

Railway stations in Miyagi Prefecture
Kesennuma Line
Ōfunato Line
Railway stations in Japan opened in 1929
Kesennuma
Stations of East Japan Railway Company